The 1921 Auburn Tigers football team represented Auburn University in the 1921 college football season. It was the Tigers' 30th season and they competed as a member of the Southern Intercollegiate Athletic Association (SIAA). The team was led by head coach Mike Donahue, in his 17th year, and played their home games at Drake Field in Auburn, Alabama. They finished with a record of five wins and three losses (5–3 overall, 3–2 in the SIAA).

Schedule

References

Auburn
Auburn Tigers football seasons
Auburn Tigers football